This is a list of first women who have been elected or appointed governor and/or chief minister of their respective states, provinces or dependent territories.

List

Italics denotes acting governors and/or chief ministers that are either de facto (with limited to no international recognition) or defunct.

See also

Council of Women World Leaders
List of current state leaders by date of assumption of office
List of female constituent and dependent territory leaders

References

First

Governors